The Fontainebleau Schools were founded in 1921, and consist of two schools: The American Conservatory, and the School of Fine Arts at Fontainebleau.

History
When the United States entered First World War the commander of its army, General Pershing, decided the quality of US military band music needed improvement. Walter Damrosch, then conductor of the New York Philharmonic, was asked to organize a school in Chaumont, where US troops were headquartered, led by composer and teacher :fr:Francis Casadesus.

The American Conservatory 
After the war, Damrosch and Casadesus decided to continue this successful operation. With the full support of French authorities, as well as that of composer and organist Charles-Marie Widor, who became its first director, the American Conservatory, was granted permission to open in the Louis XV wing of the Chateau of Fontainebleau. The American Conservatory (Fr. Conservatoire américain de Fontainebleau) intended to offer the best of French musical education to young, promising musicians.

Since 1921, the teaching staff has included renowned faculty such as: the trio Pasquier, Maurice Ravel, Camille Saint-Saëns, Marcel Dupré, Robert and Gaby Casadesus, Charles-Marie Widor, Henri Dutilleux, Gilbert Amy, Betsy Jolas, André Boucourechliev, Pierre Amoyal, Sviatoslav Richter, Mstislav Rostropovitch, Igor Stravinsky, Arthur Rubinstein, Tristan Murail and Leonard Bernstein. Nadia Boulanger, a young composition/harmony professor, was among this distinguished faculty from the beginning. Her energy, knowledge, and her spirit guided the school until 1979.  Her close friend Isidor Philipp headed the piano departments of both the Paris Conservatory and the American Conservatory. His renown in the US helped bring many American composers.  The current director presiding over the school is Diana Ligeti.

Under such renowned guidance, the American Conservatory influenced many of the best American musicians such as: Aaron Copland, Roy Harris, Virgil Thomson, Louise Talma, Samuel Dushkin, Elliott Carter, Beveridge Webster, Kenton Coe, Kenneth Lampl, and many others.

For a full history of the school, see Leonard, Kendra. The Conservatoire Americain: a History, Lanham, Md: Scarecrow Press, 2007

School of Fine Arts at Fontainebleau 
The School of Fine Arts at Fontainebleau (Fr, École des Beaux-Arts at Fontainebleau), was founded in 1923. It adopted the same mission as the music conservatory in the spheres of painting, architecture, and sculpture. Inspired by setting of the Chateau and its magnificent formal gardens, over time, the program has narrowed it focus to exclusively teach architecture.  

Its faculty has included prestigious international names in architecture, including F. Candela, A. Cuny, B. Doshi, Sheila Hicks, L. Kroll, R. Licata, R. Péchére, B. Rasica, Paolo Soleri, J. Soltan, A. Van Eyck, Y. Wohlert, Juan Nakpil, and I. García. Past directors of the school are Jacques Carlu, A. Remondet, P. Devinoy, Bernard de la Tour d'Auvergne, Marion Tournon-Branly, and J.L. Nouvian.

External links
 Official Website
 Website dedicated to the academic study of the Conservatoire

Educational institutions established in 1921
Fontainebleau
Fontainebleau
Education in Île-de-France
1921 establishments in France